Pirimicarb is a selective carbamate insecticide used to control aphids on vegetable, cereal and orchard crops by inhibiting acetylcholinesterase activity but does not affect useful predators such as ladybirds that eat them.  It was originally developed by Imperial Chemical Industries Ltd., now Syngenta, at their Jealott's Hill site and first marketed in 1969, four years after its discovery.

References

External links 
 

Acetylcholinesterase inhibitors
Carbamate insecticides
Aminopyrimidines
Aromatic carbamates